BBC HD is an international high-definition television channel provided by BBC Studios. In many countries the channel has been replaced by other BBC Studios operations. At present, the channel is only available in selected cruise ships and within the maritime industry.

It first launched in Australia. An Australian version of BBC HD was broadcast on the Foxtel HD+ service which was made available to subscribers on 2 June 2008 and was officially launched on 22 June 2008. On 15 November 2009 it was replaced on Foxtel HD+ by UKTV HD.

During the first broadcast of BBC World News America, it was announced that BBC America HD would be launched in 2008. However, the HD version did not begin broadcasting until 20 July 2009.

BBC HD started broadcasting to the Scandinavian countries in 2008. A localised Latin American feed started in 2011. In 2012 a Brazilian feed was created, though later that year, the Brazilian feed merged with that for the rest of the region, with separate audio and subtitle channels.

BBC First replaced BBC HD in Poland on 26 October 2018.

BBC HD Maritime
BBC HD was launched on P&O Cruises and Cunard cruise ships and is provided by Global Eagle Entertainment's (GEE) MTN TV network. The channel was launched on 10 January 2017 with the intention of expanding further into the maritime industry. The channel provides programmes in the genres; drama, comedy, factual entertainment, natural history, and documentaries. BBC HD also shows EastEnders, Holby City and Casualty at a similar time to their broadcast in the UK.

BBC HD Nordics
BBC HD was a television channel broadcasting high-definition programming to Sweden, Norway, Finland, Denmark and Iceland. The channel is also included in HD Cable Platform Teledünya in Turkey.

The channel was launched on 3 December 2008 from the Canal Digital platform and YouSee in Denmark. It was the third BBC HD channel overall (after the British BBC HD and BBC HD Australia), and the first in Continental Europe. The launch of BBC HD coincided with the launch of BBC Entertainment, BBC Lifestyle and BBC Knowledge in Scandinavia.

The channel broadcasts round-the-clock and heavily features BBC dramas and natural documentaries such as Bleak House and Planet Earth.

BBC HD ceased broadcast in the Nordic region on 5 January 2016.

See also 

 BBC HD (UK)

References

External links
 BBC HD Maritime

International BBC television channels
Television channels and stations established in 2008
Pan-Nordic television channels
Defunct television channels in Denmark
Defunct television channels in Norway
Defunct television channels in Finland
Defunct television channels in Sweden
BBC Worldwide